Heceta may refer to:

Bruno de Heceta, a Spanish explorer of the west coast of North America
Heceta Beach, Oregon, an unincorporated community in the United States
Heceta Head, a headland in Oregon, United States
Heceta Head Light, a lighthouse on Heceta Head
Heceta Island, an island off the coast of Alaska, United States